Eusarca venosaria is a species of geometrid moth in the family Geometridae.

The MONA or Hodges number for Eusarca venosaria is 6937.

References

Further reading

 

Ourapterygini
Articles created by Qbugbot
Moths described in 1940